Take a Look Around is the debut solo studio album by American rapper Masta Ace. It was released on July 24, 1990 through Cold Chillin' Records with distribution via Reprise Records. Recording sessions took place at House Of Hits in Chestnut Ridge, New York and at Libra Digital Sound in Long Island City. Production was handled by Marley Marl and Mister Cee.

Background
After appearing on the classic hip hop crew cut "The Symphony" with the Juice Crew in 1988, Ace released his first single, "Together" b/w "Letter to the Better" in 1989. "Together" was included in the album as well as a remixed version of "Letter to the Better".

Released in June 1990, "Me and the Biz" (b/w "I Got Ta") peaked at #47 on the Hot R&B/Hip-Hop Songs and #8 on the Hot Rap Songs. The song, a tribute of sorts to labelmate Biz Markie, in which Ace plays the role of both himself and Biz (who reportedly couldn't make it to the studio for the actual collaboration he desired), was later featured on Grand Theft Auto: San Andreas as a song in rotation on the fictional radio station Playback FM. A single for "I Got Ta" was released only in the UK and Europe.

Reaching a peak position of number thirteen on the Hot Rap Songs, the album's third single, "Music Man" (b/w "Ace Iz Wild"), remained on the chart for a total of nine weeks.

"Movin' On" (b/w "Go Where I Send Thee") was released on March 6, 1991 as the final single from Take a Look Around.

Track listing

Sample credits
Music Man
"Ben Casey Theme" by David Raksin
"Nothing Is the Same" by Grand Funk Railroad
I Got Ta
"Talkin' Loud and Sayin' Nothing" by James Brown
Letter to the Better
"Take Some...Leave Some" by James Brown 
"Think (About It)" by Lyn Collins
"Mickey's Monkey" by The Miracles
"Keep on Dancing" by Alvin Cash
Me and the Biz
"The Message" by Cymande
The Other Side Of Town
"Get Out of My Life, Woman" by Lee Dorsey
"The Other Side of Town" by Curtis Mayfield
"UFO" by ESG
Ace Iz Wild
"C'mon Children" by Earth, Wind & Fire
"Escape-Ism" by James Brown
Four Minus Three
"Hard to Handle" by Otis Redding
Can't Stop The Bumrush
"Razor Blade" by Little Royal and The Swingmasters
"Get Up Offa That Thing" by James Brown
Movin' On
"Keep on Movin'" by Soul II Soul
"Kissing My Love" by Bill Withers
"Don't Take It Personal" by Jermaine Jackson
Brooklyn Battles
"If You Let Me" by Eddie Kendricks
Maybe Next Time
"(You're Puttin') a Rush on Me" by Stephanie Mills
"Soul Power" by James Brown
Postin' High
"Street Life" by The Crusaders
"High" by Skyy
As I Reminisce
"One Man Band (Plays All Alone)" by Monk Higgins
"N.T." by Kool & the Gang
Take a Look Around
"The Revolution Will Not Be Televised" by Gil-Scott Heron
Together
"Do You Have the Time" by The Younghearts
"One Man Band" by Monk Higgins & the Specialites

Personnel
Duval Clear – vocals, co-producer
Menia Sims – vocals (track 9)
Eyceurokk – vocals (track 13)
Mike and Jay a.k.a. Together Brothers – vocals (track 15)
Andre Booth – keyboards (track 15)
D.J. Steady Pace – scratches
Marlon Williams – producer & engineering (tracks: 1, 3-7, 9-11, 14-15)
Calvin Laburn – producer (tracks: 2, 8, 12, 13)
Everett "Bizz-E" Ramos – engineering & mixing (tracks: 1, 3-7, 9-11, 14-15)
Ivan Rodriguez – engineering & mixing (tracks: 1, 3-7, 9-11, 14-15)
Chris Tergesen – engineering & mixing (tracks: 2, 8, 12, 13)
DJ Clash – engineering & recording (tracks: 1, 3-7, 9-11, 14-15)
Leon Lee – engineering & recording (tracks: 1, 3-7, 9-11, 14-15)
Thomas 'On Time' – engineering & recording (tracks: 1, 3-7, 9-11, 14-15)
Tony Aliprantis – engineering & recording (tracks: 2, 8, 12, 13)
Tony Papamichael – engineering & recording (tracks: 2, 8, 12, 13)
Benny Medina – executive producer 
Tyrone Williams – executive producer
George DuBose – art direction, photography
Aldo Sampieri – design

Charts

References

External links

Masta Ace albums
1990 debut albums
Cold Chillin' Records albums
Albums produced by Marley Marl